Paul & Shark is a luxury Italian clothing brand founded in 1975 by Paolo Dini, son of mill owner Gian Ludovico Dini. It has 280 stores worldwide and is headquartered in Varese. Its CEO is Andrea Dini.

The brand was inspired by the sail of an 18th-century clipper, inscribed with the words "Paul & Shark" seen during Dini's visit to a small sailmaker's workshop in Maine. In 2017, GQ called it "the sailing man's sailing gear". Its symbol is a shark.

The company outfitted and sponsored Italian explorer Alex Bellini in his  over 200 km cross-country skiing of the Vatnajökull, the biggest glacier in Europe.

See also 

Made in Italy
Loro Piana
Brunello Cucinelli
Etro
Brioni

References

External links

Italian companies established in 1975
Clothing brands of Italy
Clothing companies of Italy
Clothing companies established in 1975
Fashion accessory brands
High fashion brands
Luxury brands
Economy of Varese
Companies based in Lombardy
Design companies established in 1975